Royal Plaza is a shopping center located in Surabaya, East Java. The shopping mall was founded on October 7, 2006. The mall consists of 4 floors with notable tenants namely Matahari Dept. Store, ACE Hardware, Hypermart, KFC, Pizza Hut, Cinema XXI, etc.

References

External links 

  

Shopping malls in Surabaya
Tourist attractions in East Java